Dayne Neirinckx (born 25 January 1983) is an Australian former professional rugby league footballer who played for the Canterbury-Bankstown Bulldogs in the National Rugby League.

A St Clair Comets junior, Neirinckx played in the lower grades for Parramatta, before joining the Canterbury club.

Neirinckx made his only first-grade appearance for the Canterbury side in the club's win over Cronulla in the final round of the 2003 season, as a replacement centre for the injured Nigel Vagana. He remained with the Canterbury outfit in 2004, playing in the reserves competition.

In 2005 he played in France for Pia, then in 2006 competed for English club Halifax. While at Halifax he played under his Dutch passport, meaning he didn't count as an overseas player. He has represented the Netherlands in international competition.

References

External links
Dayne Neirinckx at Rugby League project

1983 births
Living people
Australian people of Dutch descent
Australian expatriate sportspeople in England
Australian rugby league players
Baroudeurs de Pia XIII players
Canterbury-Bankstown Bulldogs players
Dutch rugby league players
Halifax R.L.F.C. players
Netherlands national rugby league team players
Rugby league centres
Rugby league players from Sydney